Edgar Stangeland (born 22 July 1945) is a former speedway rider from Norway.

Speedway career 
Stangeland is a former champion of Norway, winning the Norwegian Championship in 1976. He was also a two times finalist at the Individual Speedway Long Track World Championship in 1974 and 1976.

He rode in the top tier of British Speedway from 1970 until 1979, riding for various clubs.

World final appearances

World Longtrack Championship
 1974 –  Scheeßel 18th 0pts
 1976 –  Marianske Lazne 16th 3pts

References 

1945 births
Living people
Norwegian speedway riders
Bristol Bulldogs riders
Exeter Falcons riders
Newport Wasps riders
Swindon Robins riders
Wimbledon Dons riders
Wolverhampton Wolves riders
Norwegian expatriate sportspeople in England